= Artiknos =

Town of ancient Galatia

Coordinates: 40°09′50″N 32°11′22″E

Artiknos was a town of ancient Galatia, inhabited during Roman times. Its name does not occur among ancient authors, but is inferred from epigraphic and other evidence.

Its site is located near Yağmurdede, Asiatic Turkey.
